"Train of Memories" is a song written by Andy Byrd and Jimbeau Hinson, and recorded by American country music artist Kathy Mattea.  It was released in May 1987 as the fourth single from the album Walk the Way the Wind Blows.  The song reached #6 on the Billboard Hot Country Singles & Tracks chart.

Chart performance

References

1987 singles
1986 songs
Kathy Mattea songs
Song recordings produced by Allen Reynolds
Mercury Records singles
Songs written by Jimbeau Hinson